The Storm 300 is an Italian homebuilt aircraft that was designed and produced by Storm Aircraft of Sabaudia. Storm Aircraft was originally called SG Aviation srl. When it was available the aircraft was supplied as a kit for amateur construction.

Design and development
The original model Storm 300 features a cantilever low-wing, a two-seats-in-side-by-side configuration enclosed cockpit under a bubble canopy, fixed conventional landing gear or optionally tricycle landing gear, both with wheel pants, and a single engine in tractor configuration.

The aircraft is made from aluminum sheet with some fibreglass parts.

The manufacturer estimated the construction time from the supplied kit as 500 hours or 350 hours from the quick-build kit.

The Storm 300 was later developed into the Storm Century and then the retractable gear Storm RG.

Operational history
By 1998 the company reported that 20 kits had been sold and 12 aircraft were completed and flying.

In February 2014 one example was registered in the United States with the Federal Aviation Administration and one with Transport Canada.

Specifications (Storm 300)

References

300
1990s Italian sport aircraft
1990s Italian ultralight aircraft
1990s Italian civil utility aircraft
Single-engined tractor aircraft
Low-wing aircraft
Homebuilt aircraft